-This list of exercise prescription software contains software packages related to the sending or printing of exercise instructions commonly used by physiotherapists.

B
BPM Rx is an online exercise prescription program used by physical therapists/physios and personal trainers to create exercise handouts.
BlueJay Engage  is a mobile application for physical therapy in which therapists send treatment plans with videos to patients' mobile devices and monitor progress on self-reported graphs.
Boris, Physical therapy assistant is a mobile application for physical therapy in which therapists send treatment plans with videos to patients' mobile devices and monitor progress on self-reported graphs.

E
Embodia is a platform for exercise prescription, patient education, Telehealth/Telerehab, outcomes measurement, continuing education, and complete practice management (including an EMR) with versions for web browsers and native apps (iOS + Android). Print-friendly capabilities for home programs and patient education are available. 
Enhance Therapy  is a web application software to create custom home exercises that you can email to patients or print out.
Exercise Expert  is a desktop software for Windows to create custom home exercise handouts for fitness.
Exercise Prescriber  is an online exercise prescription software tool that allows clinicians to send narrated video clips of home exercises to their patients' email or mobile phones. It also allows clinicians to send online info pages from a database of 60 common musculoskeletal conditions.
Exercise Pro Live  is a cloud based (Windows, Mac, Pads) exercise prescription service providing exercise videos and handouts for fitness and rehabilitation.
Exercise Pro  is a desktop software for Windows to create custom home exercise handouts for fitness and rehabilitation.
ExerciseSoftware.com  is an online exercise software system for physiotherapy, fitness, and exercise rehab specialists. Includes a fully customizable exercise collection.
EXPERT tool  Online application that assists physicians and healthcare professionals in choosing and adopting the optimal exercise intervention in patients with various CVDs and/or a combination of risk factors.

M
MedBridge is an online home exercise prescription software for rehabilitation professionals. It includes thousands of video-based exercises, hundreds of patient education resources, a patient portal, and a patient mobile app. 
Mavenlive is an online exercise prescription software for creating completely customized exercises programs
MediGraph is a physical therapy software package that includes support for customized exercises programs
Myclinicspace is an online exercise prescription tool for health professionals to deliver video and exercise images to patients. Generate PDF handouts for patients.
MyPtPro is a patient mobile application and website - accessible home exercise prescription SaaS for rehabilitative care.

P
Patient Exercises is a Digital Home Exercise Prescription & Patient Management software designed for healthcare professionals. PTs, Chiropractors, OTs, etc., can create HEPs by selecting from hundreds of video-demonstrated exercises, custom tailoring the instructions, and emailing or printing the home exercise programs. Patients also have their portal to login and view HEPs prescribed to them.
PT Wired is a unique home exercise program software that is designed to function as both an engaging exercise prescription software and a marketing platform. Each PT practice receives a fully branded mobile app (iOS, Android, and web) with its name, logo, and color scheme. PTs can build a patient's HEP by selecting from 3000+ exercises, aided by intelligent search, filters, and program templates. PTs can also upload their videos. Once a patient uses the app, a PT can track their progress on the patient's dashboard.
Patient Pal or Pt Pal is a web and app-based software that works on any modern web browser. Clinicians send their prescriptions to the patient. Patients can view their exercises or tasks on their phones and send feedback to the clinician or surgeon. Handouts can be generated electronically.
PTStudio is an online exercise prescription software that has a user interface and animated exercises in seven different languages. Also, a free version is available
PacPacs is an online exercise prescription and patient management package
PhysioTools is an online exercise prescription program (Windows, Mac, and handheld devices including the iPad) to generate completely customized patient handouts in paper form or digitally including video on mobile devices.
Physitrack is a platform for exercise prescription, patient education, Telehealth, and outcomes measurement, with versions for web browsers, and native apps (iOS + Android).
PhysioTrack is a web-based software that works on any modern web browser. Patients can view their exercises on their phones and send feedback to the Physio. Handouts can be generated electronically, on paper, or through the mobile app.
 PhysPrac is an iPad/iPhone application for creating, storing, editing, and sending exercise programs to patients via email.
 Physio Cloud Software is a complete solution and includes CRM, appointments, exercises, flowsheets, evaluations, accounting, medical history, assessment, and patient management system. Free trial available.

R
Rehab Guru is a comprehensive multi-platform tool aiding physiotherapists, coaches, athletes, and other medical professionals to prescribe exercises for their clients.
Rehab My Patient is an online exercise software program for therapists to print and email exercise hand-outs to patients. Complete customization on mobile, tablet, or desktop. Diary tracking, and evidence-based.
The Rehab Lab is an online exercise prescription package for generating patient handouts as PDF documents

S
SimpleSet is a complete suite of exercise prescription and patient engagement tools for physiotherapists and exercise professionals. SimpleSet helps physiotherapists to be more impactful exercise educators, and patients to be more successful in their rehabilitation.
Set4Theapy  is a School-based educational software for physical, occupational, and speech therapists.

T
TrackActive is an exercise prescription software, customizable and evidence-based. Patients can access their rehabilitation programs via web login or by mobile app.

V 
 Visual Health Information (VHI) offers computer-based, customizable software for exercise prescription, with multiple options for add-on exercise packages.

W
WebPT is web-based physical therapy software providing integrated exercise computer programs for physical therapy clinics of all sizes.
WorkOutConnect PT Therapist enables therapy professionals to create & share physical therapy protocols with clients & patients available on the web, iOS, Android mobile devices.

References

Physical therapy
Medical software
Lists of software